The 2015 BYU Cougars men's volleyball team represented Brigham Young University in the 2015 NCAA Division I men's volleyball season. The Cougars, led by fourth year head coach Chris McGown, played their home games at Smith Fieldhouse. The Cougars were members of the MPSF and were picked to finish sixth in the preseason poll. The Cougars finished the season 14–8 in conference play, good for fifth in the conference. They were eliminated in the first round of the MPSF Playoffs and did not make the NCAA Tournament.

Season highlights
BYU began the season looking to replace Taylor Sander, a three-time All-American who was BYU's best attacker, best passer, and best server. Sander led BYU to the Final Four twice and to 3-consecutive MPSF Championship matches. Josue Rivera, who was second on the team in kills in 2014, comes in a little dinged after having off-season shoulder surgery. 3 starters return from the 2014 team: Rivera, Michael Hatch, and Jaylen Reyes. These three are largely expected to make-up Sander's production along with some newcomers.

Roster

Schedule
BYU Radio will simulcast all BYUtv games with the BYUtv feed. 

 y-Indicates NCAA Playoffs
 Times listed are Mountain Time Zone.

Announcers for televised games
vs. Loyola: No announcers
vs. Lewis: No announcers
UCLA: Jarom Jordan, Steve Vail, & Lauren Francom
UCLA: Jarom Jordan, Steve Vail, & Lauren Francom
UC San Diego: Jarom Jordan & Steve Vail
Cal Baptist: Jarom Jordan, Steve Vail, & Lauren Francom
Cal Baptist: Jarom Jordan, Steve Vail, & Lauren Francom
@ USC: Mark Beltran & Paul Duchesne
@ USC: Mark Beltran & Paul Duchesne
Long Beach State: Jarom Jordan & Steve Vail
Long Beach State: Jarom Jordan, Steve Vail, & Lauren Francom
Ball State: Spencer Linton & Steve Vail
Ball State: Spencer Linton & Steve Vail
@ Stanford: No announcers
@ Stanford: No announcers
@ Pepperdine: Al Epstein
@ Pepperdine: Al Epstein
UC Irvine: Jarom Jordan, Steve Vail, & Lauren Francom
UC Irvine: Jarom Jordan, Steve Vail, & Lauren Francom
@ Cal State Northridge: No announcers
@ Cal State Northridge: No announcers
Hawai′i: Jarom Jordan, Steve Vail, & Lauren Francom
Hawai′i: Jarom Jordan, Steve Vail, & Lauren Francom
@ USC: Mark Beltran

References

2015 in sports in Utah
2015 in American sports
2015 Mountain Pacific Sports Federation volleyball season
2015 NCAA Division I & II men's volleyball season
2015 team